Roales or Roales del Pan is a municipality located in the Tierra del Pan comarca, province of Zamora, Castile and León, Spain. According to the 2004 census (INE), the municipality has a population of 501 inhabitants.

See also
Tierra del Pan

References

Municipalities of the Province of Zamora